Amy Hempel (born December 14, 1951) is an American short story writer and journalist. She teaches creative writing at the Michener Center for Writers.

Life

Hempel was born in Chicago, Illinois. She moved to California at age 16, which is where much of her early fiction takes place. She moved to New York City in the mid-seventies. There, she connected with writer and editor Gordon Lish, with whom she maintained a long professional relationship. She formerly was professor of creative writing at the University of Florida. She was the Briggs-Copeland Lecturer of English at Harvard University from 2009 to 2014. Additionally, she teaches fiction in the Low-Residency MFA Program in Writing at Bennington College. She has previously taught at Sarah Lawrence College, Duke University, The New School, Brooklyn College, and Princeton University. She is also a contributing editor at The Alaska Quarterly Review.

A dog enthusiast, Hempel is a founding board member of the Deja Foundation.

Career

Hempel is a former student of Gordon Lish, in whose workshop she wrote several of her first stories. Lish was so impressed with her work that he helped her publish her first collection, Reasons to Live (1985), which includes "In the Cemetery Where Al Jolson Is Buried", the first story she ever wrote. Hempel credits Lish's influence for the lack of pressure she has felt to become a novelist rather than a short story writer. Originally published in TriQuarterly in 1983, "In the Cemetery Where Al Jolson Is Buried" is one of the most frequently anthologized stories in contemporary fiction.

Hempel has produced three other collections: At the Gates of the Animal Kingdom (1990), which includes the story "The Harvest"; Tumble Home (1997); and The Dog of the Marriage (2005). Tumble Home was Hempel's first novella, which she structured as a letter to an unspecified recipient and called "the most personal thing I've ever written." Both "In the Cemetery Where Al Jolson is Buried" and Tumble Home highlight animals' ability to express emotions and draw them out of people. In an interview in BOMB Magazine, Hempel explained, "I think there's a purity of feeling there that humans can connect with if we're lucky, or if we're looking for it."

The Collected Stories of Amy Hempel (2006) gathers all the stories from the four earlier books. She co-edited (with Jim Shepard) Unleashed–Poems by Writers' Dogs (1995), which includes contributions by Edward Albee, John Irving, Denis Johnson, Gordon Lish, Arthur Miller, and many others. She writes articles, essays, and short stories for such publications as Vanity Fair, Interview, BOMB, GQ, ELLE, Harper's Magazine, The Quarterly, and Playboy. Hempel has participated in several conferences including The Juniper Summer Writing Institute at the University of Massachusetts Amherst's MFA Program for Poets & Writers. In 2015, Hempel judged a flash fiction contest for Nat. Brut magazine.

Generally termed a minimalist writer, along with Raymond Carver, Mary Robison, and Frederick Barthelme, Hempel is one of a handful of writers who has built a reputation based solely on short fiction. Hempel purposefully leaves her stories' narrators unnamed, as "there are more possibilities when you don't pin down a person with a name and an age and a background because then people can bring something to them or take something from them."

Hempel currently teaches in the MFA Program at the Michener Center for Writers at University of Texas at Austin.

Awards
In 2000, Hempel received the Hobson Award and was awarded with a Guggenheim Fellowship. In 2006, she was awarded a USA Fellowship grant by United States Artists, an arts advocacy foundation dedicated to the support and promotion of America's top living artists. She won the Ambassador Book Award in 2007 for her Collected Stories, which was also named as one of The New York Times Ten Best Books of the year. In 2008, she won the Rea Award for the Short Story. In 2009, she received the PEN/Malamud Award for Short Fiction along with Alistair MacLeod. In 2015, Hempel received the John William Corrington Award for Literary Excellence from Centenary College.

Bibliography
 Reasons to Live (1985)
 At the Gates of the Animal Kingdom (1990)
 Tumble Home (1997)
 Unleashed: Poems by Writers' Dogs (1999) (editor, with Jim Shepard)
 The Dog of the Marriage London : Quercus, 2008. , 
 The Collected Stories of Amy Hempel New York: Scribner, 2006. , 
New Stories from the South 2010: The Year's Best (editor with Kathy Pories) Chapel Hill, N.C. : Algonquin Books of Chapel Hill, 2010. , 
Sing to It New York : Scribner, 2019. ,

References

External links

 
 Hempel interviewed at Gigantic
 Transcript of interview with Ramona Koval, The Book Show, ABC Radio National
 Interview of Amy Hempel by Rob Hart
 Full text of "Today Will Be A Quiet Day" by Amy Hempel
 Full Text of "Offertory" by Amy Hempel
 Short Story: "In the Cemetery Where Al Jolson is Buried" on Fictionaut
 Short Story: "The Harvest" at Pif Magazine
 1997 BOMB Magazine interview of Amy Hempel by Suzan Sherman

American women short story writers
American women journalists
Minimalist writers
Writers from Chicago
Writers from New York (state)
1951 births
Living people
American academics of English literature
Brooklyn College faculty
Princeton University faculty
Harvard University faculty
University of Massachusetts Amherst faculty
PEN/Malamud Award winners
PEN/Faulkner Award for Fiction winners
20th-century American short story writers
20th-century American journalists
20th-century American women writers
21st-century American short story writers
21st-century American journalists
21st-century American women writers
American women academics
Members of the American Academy of Arts and Letters